Darreh Zagheh-ye Bala (also Romanized as Darreh Zāgheh-ye Bālā and Darreh Zāgheh Bālā; also known as Darreh Zāgheh-ye ‘Olyā) is a village in Valanjerd Rural District, in the Central District of Borujerd County, Lorestan Province, Iran. At the 2006 census, its population was 219, in 51 families.

References 

Towns and villages in Borujerd County